is a Japanese four-panel comic strip manga series written and illustrated by Tenpō Gensui, which began serialization in Tokuma Shoten's seinen manga magazine Monthly Comic Ryū in October 2008. The manga follows the everyday life of three middle school girls. The first bound volume was released on May 20, 2008, followed by the second volume on August 20, 2009.

Characters

Shōsei is the main character and has a crush on Mayuko. She is usually pretty quiet but occasionally does something crazy.

Mayuko is a rich girl and Shōsei's best friend. Due to her 'princess cut' hair and other feminine charms, she has become the idol of the school. She is generally a bit of a tease when it comes to Shōsei's flirting.

Mawata is an otaku and a member of the school's manga club. As such, she is obsessed with everything manga, anime and cosplay. She creates a lot of dōjinshi that she sells at conventions such as Comiket, and usually tricks Mayuko and Shōsei into helping her out. She has a particular interest in yaoi and yuri manga.

References

External links
Monthly Comic Ryū website for Choir! 
Creator's website 

Comedy anime and manga
2008 manga
Seinen manga
Yonkoma
Yuri (genre) anime and manga
Tokuma Shoten manga
Slice of life anime and manga